Mohomed Dilshad (born 30 April 1992) is a Sri Lankan cricketer. He made his first-class debut for Panadura Sports Club in the 2012–13 Premier League Tournament on 22 February 2013.

In March 2018, he was named in Galle's squad for the 2017–18 Super Four Provincial Tournament. The following month, he was also named in Galle's squad for the 2018 Super Provincial One Day Tournament.

In August 2018, he was named in Galle's squad the 2018 SLC T20 League. In January 2020, in the opening round of matches in the 2019–20 SLC Twenty20 Tournament, he took a five-wicket haul for Saracens Sports Club.

References

External links
 

1992 births
Living people
Sri Lankan cricketers
Panadura Sports Club cricketers
Saracens Sports Club cricketers